Yuriy Yaroshenko (born 5 January 1961, in Frunze (today Bishkek), Kyrgyz SSR) is a former Soviet and Ukrainian footballer and Ukrainian football coach.

He has a son Kostyantyn Yaroshenko who plays football.

Coach career
He has been elected * Best Coach of Round 4, Best Coach of Round 7, and Best Coach of Round 8 of Ukrainian First League in the season 2021-22.

Honours

As Player
Zorya Luhansk
 Soviet Second League (1): 1986
 Ukrainian SSR: (1) 1986

As Coach
Individual
 Best Coach of Round 4 of Ukrainian First League: 2021-22
 Best Coach of Round 7 of Ukrainian First League: 2021-22
 Best Coach of Round 8 of Ukrainian First League: 2021-22

References

External links

External links
 
 Yaroshenko profile at footballfacts.ru

1961 births
Living people
Sportspeople from Bishkek
Kyrgyzstani emigrants to Ukraine
Piddubny Olympic College alumni
Soviet footballers
Ukrainian footballers
Ukrainian expatriate footballers
Expatriate footballers in Russia
Ukrainian expatriate sportspeople in Russia
Expatriate footballers in Uzbekistan
Ukrainian expatriate sportspeople in Uzbekistan
Expatriate footballers in Poland
Ukrainian expatriate sportspeople in Poland
FC Zorya Luhansk players
CSF Bălți players
FC Krystal Kherson players
FC Khimik Severodonetsk players
Navbahor Namangan players
FC Dynamo Luhansk players
FC Hirnyk Rovenky players
Ukrainian First League players
Ukrainian Second League players
Ukrainian football managers
PFC Sumy managers
FC Poltava managers
FC Alians Lypova Dolyna managers
Ukrainian First League managers
Ukrainian Second League managers
Association football midfielders
Association football forwards
FC SKA Rostov-on-Don players